Rhodoarrhenia is a genus of fungi in the family Cyphellaceae. Most Rhodoarrhenia species have a tropical or subtropical distribution. The genus was circumscribed by mycologist Rolf Singer in 1963. He made R. pezizoidea the type species; in its taxonomic history, this fungus had been placed in the genera Merulius, Campanella, Rimbachia, and Arrhenia by various authors.

See also
List of Agaricales genera

References

Cyphellaceae
Agaricales genera
Taxa named by Rolf Singer